Tallong is in the traditional lands of the Gundungurra people. It is a village within the Southern Tablelands region of New South Wales, Australia, in Goulburn-Mulwaree Council. The village is located just outside the southern extremity of the Southern Highlands region and has some cultural and historic connections with this region also. The town is 8.5 km from the town of Marulan and 25 km from the town of Bundanoon.

The principal industries of the village include stud farms, arts and crafts and services for surrounding farms.

Tallong is home to the Tallong Midge Orchid (Genoplesium plumosum), a tiny flower found only in the area surrounding the town. This orchid is now a protected species. It was discovered in 1997.

Etymology 

The original settlement was named Barber's Creek after the watercourse that runs through the town. In the early twentieth century the town was renamed "Tallong" after an Aboriginal word meaning either "tongue" or "spring of water".

History

Colonial era 
The first European settler in the area was George Barber, a cattle farmer. In 1814 Barber established a cattle station along what became known as Barber's Creek. In 1821 he received a grant of  covering the general Tallong-Marulan district, to be converted from cedar brush to farmland. He is buried in the Old Marulan Cemetery in Marulan.

In the late 1820s, that portion of Barber's land that would eventually become the township was sold or reallocated to Sydney entrepreneur and mariner Billy Blue. Convict labour was used to clear the grazing land and prepare a route for the Main South railway line to Goulburn. Tallong was selected as the location for a railway refuelling point, and the town's initial population consisted of convicts, woodcutters, railway workers and their families.

The opening of the railway in 1869 brought shops, a school, hotels and a post office to the town.

Post-Federation 
By 1900, cattle grazing was slowly giving way to a thriving fruit industry, known particularly for apples and pears. The village sent an annual exhibit of a tall pyramid of fruit to the Sydney Royal Easter Show; Tallong's apples and pears took top honours several times throughout the early part of the twentieth century.

The population reached 200 in 1920, and a Memorial Hall was constructed to mark the town's growth and record the service of local residents in World War I. The Hall and war memorial are still standing today.

In 1955 the Australian poet and novelist Seaforth Mackenzie drowned while attempting to swim across Tallong (formerly Barber's) Creek near the town.

Tallong was destroyed in the Chatsbury bushfire of 1965. It's economy did not fully recover and the award-winning fruit industry folded.  Many residents moved and the post office and a number of small businesses closed.

Heritage listings 
Tallong has a number of heritage-listed sites, including:
 Main Southern railway: Tallong railway station

Attractions 
The village is also home to one of the oldest surviving single-teacher schoolhouses in Australia at Tallong Public School. Moreover, it is home to the country campus of Santa Sabina College.

The lookouts are known as Badgerys Lookout and Longpoint Lookout.

Tallong is home to the big apple and host to the award-winning annual "Apple Day" festival.

There is also an annual Tallong Trail Ride in support of the Rural Fire Service.

See also
 Wingello Parish, Camden
 Tallong Public School
 Tallong railway station, New South Wales

References

Further reading
The Tallong Public School, Peter Westren, ed., privately published, Tallong:  1990.
Southern Village View Magazine, Published Quarterly by the Southern Village View Association Inc.  Wingello, NSW.

External links
An article on the history and description of Tallong

 
Towns of the Southern Highlands (New South Wales)
Southern Tablelands
Goulburn Mulwaree Council